Donacaula longirostrallus, the long-beaked donacaula moth, is a moth in the family Crambidae. It was described by James Brackenridge Clemens in 1860. It is found in North America, where it has been recorded from Nova Scotia, Ontario, Quebec, Alabama, Arkansas, Connecticut, Florida, Louisiana, Maine, Massachusetts, Michigan, Mississippi, Nebraska, New Jersey, New York, North Carolina, Pennsylvania, Texas, Vermont and Virginia.

The length of the forewings is 22–28 mm. The forewings are yellowish white irrorated (sprinkled) with light brown. The hindwings are yellowish white. Adults have been recorded on wing from May to September.

References

Moths described in 1860
Schoenobiinae